Ovenden railway station served the village of Ovenden in West Yorkshire, England. It was on the Halifax and Ovenden Junction Railway and closed in 1955. Because of the local area at Ovenden, the L&Y and the GN did not think it was important to have a nice station, so it was built of timber. However, it is the only station building which still exists, far outliving the stone buildings. 
Just along the line from Ovenden Station was Lee Bank Tunnel.

References

External links
 Ovenden station on navigable 1947 O. S. map

Disused railway stations in Calderdale
Former Halifax and Ovenden Junction Railway stations
Railway stations in Great Britain opened in 1881
Railway stations in Great Britain closed in 1955
1881 establishments in England